The 2022 AFC Women's Asian Cup qualification was the qualification tournament for the 2022 AFC Women's Asian Cup.

A total of twelve teams qualified to play in the final tournament in India. The host country India and the top three teams of the previous tournament in 2018 qualified automatically, while the other eight teams were decided by qualification, with the matches played between 17 and 29 September and 18–24 October 2021 in centralised venues.

This tournament also served as the first stage of Asian qualification for the 2023 FIFA Women's World Cup, where five teams from the Women's Asian Cup qualify directly for the World Cup (plus co-hosts Australia), and two teams qualify for a 10-team playoff tournament.

Draw
Northern Mariana Islands, whose association became the 47th full AFC member during the confederation's 30th Congress on 9 December 2020, were eligible to enter the qualification tournament, but did not participate. They are not FIFA members and thus would not be eligible to qualify for the 2023 Women's World Cup.

Originally, the draw was to be held on 27 May 2021, 15:30 MST (UTC+8), at the Asian Football Confederation (AFC) House in Kuala Lumpur, Malaysia. However, due to rising cases of COVID-19 across Asia, the AFC decided to postpone the original draw date until further notice. On 23 June, the confederation announced the seeding and the date for the draw, which was held on 24 June, 16:30 MYT (UTC+8), at the AFC House. The 28 teams were drawn into four groups of four teams and four groups of three teams.

The teams were seeded according to their performance in the 2018 AFC Women's Asian Cup final tournament and qualification (overall ranking shown in parentheses). The following restrictions were also applied:
The seven teams which indicated their intention to serve as qualification group hosts prior to the draw were drawn into separate groups.
These hosts country is allocated to positions in each group according to their ranking:
Chinese Taipei and Myanmar in position 1
Tajikistan and Uzbekistan in position 2
Bangladesh, Indonesia, and Nepal in position 4 (if drawn in Group A–D) or position 3 (if drawn in Group E–G)

Notes
Teams in bold qualified for the final tournament.
(H): Qualification group hosts determined before the draw
(H)*: Qualification group hosts determined after the draw
(NR): Non-ranked
(W): Withdrew after draw

Did not enter

 (H)*
 (withdrew prior to draw)

 (suspended)

Groups
The matches were played during the windows of 16–29 September and 18–24 October 2021.

Tiebreakers
Teams are ranked according to points (3 points for a win, 1 point for a draw, 0 points for a loss), and if tied on points, the following tiebreaking criteria are applied, in the order given, to determine the rankings (Regulations Article 7.3):
Points in head-to-head matches among tied teams;
Goal difference in head-to-head matches among tied teams;
Goals scored in head-to-head matches among tied teams;
If more than two teams are tied, and after applying all head-to-head criteria above, a subset of teams are still tied, all head-to-head criteria above are reapplied exclusively to this subset of teams;
Goal difference in all group matches;
Goals scored in all group matches;
Penalty shoot-out if only two teams are tied and they met in the last round of the group;
Disciplinary points (yellow card = 1 point, red card as a result of two yellow cards = 3 points, direct red card = 3 points, yellow card followed by direct red card = 4 points);
Drawing of lots.

Group A
Chinese Taipei was originally to host the group, but it was changed due to the activity limitations imposed on foreign teams in Taiwan. On 15 September, Bahrain was confirmed as the Group hosts. 
Times listed are UTC+3.

Group B
All matches were held in Tajikistan.
Times listed are UTC+5.

Group C
Both matches were held in Tajikistan.
Times listed are UTC+5.

Group D
All matches were originally to be held in Lebanon. On 15 September, Kyrgyzstan was confirmed as the group hosts. 
Times listed are UTC+6.

Group E
All matches were held in Uzbekistan.
Times listed are UTC+5.

Group F
Nepal was originally to host the group. Tashkent, Uzbekistan was announced as the replacement host.
Times listed are UTC+5.

Group G
Bangladesh was originally to host the group, but considered a withdrawal from hosting due to COVID-19 pandemic in the country. The AFC announced Uzbekistan as the replacement host.

Group H
All matches were held in Palestine.
Times listed are UTC+2:00.

Qualified teams
The following 12 teams qualified for the final tournament.

1 Bold indicates champions for that year. Italic indicates hosts for that year.

Goalscorers

References

External links
, the-AFC.com

Qualification
2022
Women's Asian Cup qualification
2021 in women's association football
September 2021 sports events in Asia
October 2021 sports events in Asia